Events in the year 1879 in Portugal.

Incumbents
Monarch: Luís I 
President of the Council of Ministers: Fontes Pereira de Melo (until 1 June), Anselmo José Braamcamp (from 1 June)

Events
 19 October - Legislative election

Births
 21 November - Raul Lino, architect (died 1974)
 30 December - Manuel Gourlade, football manager (died 1908)
 António Correia de Oliveira, poet (died 1960)

Deaths
 20 February - Joaquim Heliodoró da Cunha Rivara, physician, professor, intellectual, politician (born 1809)
 Eugênia Câmara, actress (born 1837)

See also
List of colonial governors in 1879#Portugal

References

 
Portugal
Years of the 19th century in Portugal
Portugal